Dominowo  is a village in Środa Wielkopolska County, Greater Poland Voivodeship, in west-central Poland. It is the seat of the gmina (administrative district) called Gmina Dominowo.

References

Villages in Środa Wielkopolska County